Copelatus congo is a species of diving beetle. It is part of the genus Copelatus in the subfamily Copelatinae of the family Dytiscidae. It was described by Gschwendtner in 1938.

References

congo
Beetles described in 1938